Salvation Mountain is a hillside visionary environment created by local resident Leonard Knight (1931–2014) in the California Desert area of Imperial County, north of Calipatria, northeast of Niland, near the Slab City squatter/art commune, and several miles from the Salton Sea.

The artwork is made of adobe bricks, discarded tires and windows, automobile parts and thousands of gallons of paint. It encompasses numerous murals and areas painted with Christian sayings and Bible verses, though its philosophy was built around the Sinner's Prayer.

The Folk Art Society of America declared it "a folk art site worthy of preservation and protection" in the year 2000. In an address to the United States Congress on May 15, 2002, California Senator Barbara Boxer described it as "a unique and visionary sculpture... a national treasure... profoundly strange and beautifully accessible, and worthy of the international acclaim it receives".

In December 2011, the 80-year-old Knight was placed in a long-term care facility in El Cajon for dementia. Leonard Knight died on February 10, 2014, in El Cajon. He was able to visit Salvation Mountain for the last time in May 2013; the visit was recorded by KPBS (TV).

Concern was raised in 2012 for the future of the site, which requires constant upkeep due to the harsh desert environment. Many visitors were donating paint to the project, and a group of volunteers worked to protect and maintain the site. In February 2011, a public charity, Salvation Mountain, Inc., was established to support the project. In 2013, the Annenberg Foundation donated $32,000 to Salvation Mountain Inc. for materials and equipment to "improve security and strengthen operations". A 2014 article stated that Salvation Mountain Inc. was operated by the nine volunteer members of its board.

Formations 
Knight was born on November 1, 1931, outside Burlington, Vermont, and had served in the Korean War. In the 1970s, Knight had the idea to paint the Sinner's Prayer on a hot air balloon – reading "GOD IS LOVE" in bright red on a white fabric. He built one out of patchwork materials & a stove, but it would not fly. By 1984, Knight had discovered Slab City – a transient & retiree commune – and decided to leave a 'small monument' out of concrete and paint. Over five years, the project grew.

The current Salvation Mountain is actually the second construction to occupy the site; Knight began the first Salvation Mountain in 1984. A rainstorm caused a crack in 1989 which caused it to collapse. Knight was not discouraged; he rather saw it as God's way of letting him know the Mountain was not safe. He began work on the current Salvation Mountain "with more smarts" – such as better materials and engineering, including adobe mixed with straw. After completion, the "mountain" was several stories high and was about a hundred yards wide.

In 1998, Knight wanted to expand the mountain. He gathered ideas from the Navajo who settled in the area around Salvation Mountain. Their pueblitos inspired Knight and he then began forming the Hogan. It is a dome-like structure made of adobe and straw that insulates from heat. Knight intended to live in it, though he always preferred to live in a shack on the back of his truck, and did so for 27 years. For a long period, he had help with the project from a friend, Bill Ammon ("Builder Bill"), of Slab City.

Knight was known for giving free tours to every visitor at Salvation Mountain. An article about Leonard Knight stated that he was a "visionary American folk artist" whose message was "unconditional love to humankind". Knight "arrived accidentally ... [but] immediately recognized an opportunity to continue his large-scale gospel message. He made a mountain with his bare hands. Leonard built Salvation Mountain".

Later years 

Knight also began another formation, what he liked to call "the museum". It is modeled after the semi-inflated hot air balloon Knight tried to create before Salvation Mountain; the balloon is now on view at the American Visionary Art Museum. The museum is a semi-dome structure in the mountain that contains several small items given to him by friends and visitors. Each item has a significance and, more often than not, visitors seek out Salvation Mountain to pray and leave an item at the mountain as symbolism of giving themselves to God. The museum is held up by adobe and straw, but also by car parts and a tangle of trees that twist within the dome and reach through the top.

Over the last ten years of his life, Knight planned to repaint the mountain twice a year to ensure that the paint layer would be very thick. He was unable to continue this because of an injury sustained in 2011.

Leonard Knight was featured in Sean Penn's Into the Wild, released in 2007. Knight died in 2014. An obituary of Knight stated that he "spent almost 30 years building the colorful mountain in the Imperial Valley desert, just outside of Niland, Calif. Built out of adobe and donated paint, Knight worked on the mountain all day, every day. He even slept at the mountain's base in the back of a pick-up truck, with no electricity or running water. He bathed in the nearby natural hot springs."

A National Geographic article published after Knight's death provided this insight into the creator of Salvation Mountain."A visionary ... Leonard worked beyond our concept of time, slowly and methodically without ever wandering from his path. His sole purpose in this endeavor was to spread the message that 'God is Love'. He shared this with everyone who came to the mountain ..."The work still stands as a 50 ft-tall piece of religious folk art, and for Slab City, "an unofficial centrepiece for the community and [cementing] the area's anarchic creative identity", according to a 2020 report.

Paint toxicity concerns 
In July 1994, Imperial County hired a toxic waste specialist to test the soils around Salvation Mountain, with results showing high levels of lead toxicity. Knight and his supporters gathered signatures for a second test to be done by an independent party of his choosing. That test came back negative, supporting Knight's claim that he used non-toxic paints and that there were no toxins in the soil. However Knight's claim of using latex paint is still concerning. The Pollution Prevention Regional Information Center cites latex paint as, “Highly toxic to the environment. It harms fish and wildlife, and contaminates the food chain if poured down a storm drain. It can also pollute groundwater if dumped on the ground.”

Media appearances 
 In 2008, the band Third Day released the album Revelation, which featured an artistic depiction of Salvation Mountain as the album's cover image. The liner notes for Revelation state that the album art is "an artistic interpretation" of Salvation Mountain.
 Huell Howser did two interviews ten years apart for his series California's Gold. In the second interview, he described the changes made since the first interview.
 The music video for the American singer, songwriter, and rapper Kesha's song "Praying" was partially filmed on Salvation Mountain.
 The music video for British rock band, Coldplay's song Birds, was filmed on the Salvation Mountain.

References

External links 

 Official Salvation Mountain website
 Salvation Mountain – History Website
 Salvation Mountain footage and interviews with Leonard Knight by Sherman George and Greg Durbin, UC San Diego Library Digital Collections
 Youtube.com: Video Tour of Salvation Mountain with Leonard Knight from Weird U.S.

Adobe sculptures
Land art
Visionary environments
Outdoor sculptures in California
Tourist attractions in Imperial County, California
Colorado Desert